Elibia linigera is a moth of the  family Sphingidae . It is known from the Philippines.

It is very similar to Elibia dolichus, but the forewing outer margin is slightly more convex and the apex more acute. The forewing underside has a ragged submarginal band that is darker red and broader than in Elibia dolichus. Because of the similarities, it was considered a synonym of Elibia dolichus for some time.

References

Macroglossini
Moths described in 1875